The Tamaiaz wa Falak Tayyeb awards (Tamaiaz means excel and wa Falak Tayyeb means 'and consider it done') were launched in 2008 by Mawarid Finance PJSC to foster local potential by rewarding innovations by young UAE nationals, and helping them embark on successful and rewarding careers. It sought to drive Emiratisation and "help fill the gap between academic education and the job market by empowering [young Emiratis] to enter the market and guiding them on how to convert their innovative ideas into reality."

UAE national students or recent graduates under 25 years of age, pursuing an education in the UAE or abroad can apply. The winners get cash prizes between AED 5,000 and AED 20,000 (1 USD = AED 3.67). Other than the cash, trophies and certificates, winners also get special job offers (from the local sponsors, with a 25% pay bump on entry-level salaries), special benefits after they are employed and training to ensure their professional success. Mawarid offers employment to the toppers in each category.

The initiative, with an annual budget of AED 1 million, is sponsored by His Highness Sheikh Maktoum bin Mohammed bin Rashid Al Maktoum, Deputy Ruler of Dubai. The five sponsors, other than Mawarid Finance, who joined in 2011 are Dubai Investments, Dar Altakaful, du, Commercial Bank International, Al Naboodah Group and NextLevel Consultancy.

The award has been promoted in several universities in the region and at various fora and career fairs. Strict international standards are applied to the registrants to determine the final participants. Participation in the competition more than doubled from 250 finalists (500 applicants) in the first year to 785 finalists (960 applicants) in the second year.

Award categories
There are 5 awards each in seven categories: 

 Marketing, Communication and Media
 Accounting, Banking and Finance
 Leadership and Management
 Shariah and Law
 Information Systems and Technology
 Entrepreneurship and Inventions
 Islamic Financial Products and Insurance

The last two categories were added in 2009 after gauging market demands.

Judging criteria and timeline
The projects submitted by participants(individual/group, with maximum 5 members) are evaluated on:
Novelty and usefulness of the idea- 20%
Research conducted- 20%
Project presentation and discussion- 30%,
Illustrative tools such as posters and videos used- 10%
Efforts put in- 10%
Adherence to award templates and punctuality- 10%

Registration usually begins every year at the end of October, with project submission deadlines around 1 May of the following year, culminating in the award ceremony at the end of May.

Board of trustees

Chairman: Mohamed Musabbeh Al Neaimi (also Mawarid CEO, on Board of Directors)
Deputy Chairman: Saleh Al Hashimi (also on Mawarid Board of Directors)
Secretary General: Rehab Lootah (also Mawarid Head of Business Development, Products and Corporate Communications)
Members:
Jamal Al Jassmi (General Manager, Emirates Institute for Banking & Financial Studies)
Salim Al Qaseer (Vice Chancellor, American University of Sharjah)
Dr. Sulaiman Al Jassim (Chairman, Zayed University)
Dr. Fatma Al Shamsi (Secretary General, UAE University)

References

External links
 Tamaiaz Awards
 Mawarid Finance

Emirati awards
Awards established in 2008
Early career awards
2008 establishments in the United Arab Emirates